According to Costa Rica’s 1977 Indigenous Law, the Indigenous Territories are the traditional lands of the legally recognized indigenous peoples of Costa Rica. The Republic of Costa Rica recognizes eight native ethnicities; Bribris, Chorotegas, Malekus, Ngöbe, Huetars, Cabecars, Borucas and Terrabas.

The Law also provides the territories of self-government and autonomy according to the traditional organization of the tribes, yet this is hardly applied. According to the Law all non-indigenous residents with properties in the areas acquired before the promulgation of the Law should be relocated and/or indemnified, and all posterior acquisition of lands is illegal and should be expropriated with no compensation, but this hasn’t been endorsed by Costa Rica’s government. Tension between indigenous and white residents of the areas of Salitre and Cabagra has become violent to the point of mutual aggressions.

Territories 
Currently there are 24 officially recognized indigenous territories:

Notes

 
T
Subdivisions of Costa Rica
Lands reserved for indigenous peoples